Iberodytes ramiroi is a species of beetle in the family Carabidae, the only species in the genus Iberodytes.

References

Scaritinae